Brian Emanuel Schatz (born October 20, 1972) is an American educator and politician serving as the senior United States senator from Hawaii, a seat he has held since 2012. A member of the Democratic Party, Schatz served in the Hawaii House of Representatives from 1998 to 2006, representing the 25th legislative district; as the chairman of the Democratic Party of Hawaii from 2008 to 2010; and as the 12th lieutenant governor of Hawaii from 2010 to 2012.

Schatz also worked as chief executive officer of Helping Hands Hawaii, an Oahu nonprofit social service agency, until he resigned to run for lieutenant governor of Hawaii in the 2010 gubernatorial election as Abercrombie's running mate. He served as lieutenant governor until December 26, 2012, when Abercrombie appointed him to serve the rest of Daniel Inouye's U.S. Senate term after Inouye's death. Schatz was the youngest U.S. senator in the 112th Congress. He won the 2014 special election to complete the remainder of Inouye's Senate term with just under 70% of the vote, was reelected in 2016 with 73.6%, and again in 2022 with 71.2%.

Early life
Brian Schatz was born into a Jewish-American family in Ann Arbor, Michigan, along with an identical twin brother, Steve. He is the son of Barbara Jane (née Binder) and Irwin Jacob Schatz, a cardiologist and native of Saint Boniface, Manitoba.

Schatz's father was the first to complain about the ethics of the Tuskegee syphilis experiment, in a 1965 letter. The letter was ignored until the problem finally came to public attention in 1972. Irwin Schatz wrote that he was "astounded" that "physicians allow patients with potentially fatal disease to remain untreated when effective therapy is available." Brian Schatz said that his father didn't talk about the letter, but that it influenced him to pursue the public good.

When Schatz and his brother were two years old the family moved to Hawaii, where Schatz graduated from Punahou School. Schatz enrolled at Pomona College in Claremont, California; he spent a term studying abroad in Kenya on a program of the School for International Training (SIT). As a U.S. senator, Schatz is one of Pomona's highest-profile alumni; Pomona invited him to be the commencement speaker for its Class of 2017. After graduating in 1994 with a B.A. in philosophy, he returned to Hawaii, where he taught at Punahou before taking on other jobs in the nonprofit sector. He was briefly a member of the Green Party.

Early career
Schatz became active in the community in the 1980s through his involvement in Youth for Environmental Services. He then served as CEO of Helping Hands Hawaii and director of the Makiki Community Library and of the Center for a Sustainable Future. In March 2010, Schatz stepped down from Helping Hands to run for lieutenant governor. He was a member of the 2007 class of the Pacific Century Fellows.

Hawaii House of Representatives (1998–2006) 
In 1998, Schatz challenged the incumbent State Representative of the 24th district of the Hawaii House of Representatives, Republican Sam Aiona, and won, 53%–47%. In the 2000 rematch he was reelected, 57%–43%.

In 2002 he ran in the newly redrawn 25th House district, and defeated Republican Bill Hols, 69%–31%. In 2004 he defeated Republican Tracy Okubo, 64%–36%. The 25th district includes Makiki and Tantalus on Oahu.

Subsequent political career (2006–10)

2006 congressional election 

The Democratic primary featured 10 candidates, seven of whom served in the Hawaii Legislature. Mazie Hirono, the lieutenant governor, was the only one who had held statewide office and thus enjoyed the most name recognition. She also raised the most money, mostly because of the endorsement of EMILY's List, and lent her own campaign $100,000. She won the primary with 22% of the vote, just 845 votes ahead of State Senator Colleen Hanabusa. Schatz finished sixth with 7% of the vote, behind Hirono and four state senators.

Support for Obama 
One of the earliest supporters of Barack Obama for president, Schatz founded a group with other Hawaii Democrats in December 2006 to urge Obama to run, saying, "For the last six years we've been governed by fear, fear of terrorists, fear of other countries, even fear of the other party...everyone is governing by fear and Barack Obama changes all of that. He wants to govern the United States by hope." In 2008 Schatz worked as spokesman for Obama's campaign in Hawaii.

State chairman 
In April 2008, Schatz began running for the position of chairman of the Democratic Party of Hawaii, and won the job at the state convention the following month. During his tenure, the Democrats increased the number of active party members and delivered Obama's best performance of any state in the country. Hawaii native Obama won the state with 72% of the vote; just 54% of the state voted for Democratic nominee John Kerry in 2004. Schatz stepped down as party chairman on January 9, 2010.

Lieutenant Governor (2010–12)

2010 election 

On January 10, 2010, Schatz announced his candidacy for lieutenant governor of Hawaii. His campaign priorities included the creation of clean-energy jobs, public education, and technological improvements in the public sector. He also declared his support for Hawaii House Bill 444, which would have allowed same-sex civil unions in Hawaii but was vetoed by Republican Governor Linda Lingle. A number of Hawaii labor unions endorsed Schatz for lieutenant governor in the Democratic primary, held on September 18, 2010. Schatz won the nomination with 34.8% of the vote, and thus became Neil Abercrombie's running mate in the November general election.

Tenure 
On December 6, 2010, Schatz was inaugurated as Hawaii's 11th lieutenant governor alongside Abercrombie, who had defeated Republican incumbent Lieutenant Governor Duke Aiona in the gubernatorial election. Hawaii State Supreme Court Associate Justice James E. Duffy, Jr. administered the oath of office at the Coronation Pavilion on the grounds of ʻIolani Palace.

U.S. Senate (2012–present)

Appointment 
Shortly before Senator Daniel Inouye died on December 17, 2012, he dictated a letter to Governor Neil Abercrombie asking that U.S. Representative Colleen Hanabusa be appointed to finish his term.

Hawaii law on interim appointments to the U.S. Senate requires the governor to choose from three candidates selected by the party of the previous officeholder. On December 26, 2012, the Hawaii Democratic Party nominated Schatz, Hanabusa, and deputy director of the Hawaii Department of Land and Natural Resources Esther Kia'aina. The same day, Abercrombie appointed Schatz, despite Inouye's request. Later that night, Schatz accompanied President Barack Obama back to Washington, D.C. on Air Force One. On December 27 Schatz was sworn in as a senator by Vice President Joe Biden.

Schatz's appointment to Inouye's seat on December 27, 2012, made him the senior senator from Hawaii (Mazie Hirono, who had been elected to the other Senate seat that November to replace retiring Senator Daniel Akaka, took office one week later on January 3, 2013). He became only the sixth person to represent Hawaii in the U.S. Senate, and only the second who was not Asian American, after Oren E. Long (1959–1963).

Elections

2014 

Schatz announced his intention to run for election in the special election to be held in 2014 for the balance of Inouye's ninth term. In April 2013 Hanabusa announced she would challenge Schatz in the primary. The core of the Schatz campaign was climate change and renewable energy. Schatz defeated Hanabusa by 1,782 votes (0.75%) in a primary delayed in two precincts by Hurricane Iselle.

As expected in heavily Democratic Hawaii, Schatz went on to win the general election, defeating Republican Campbell Cavasso with about 70% of the vote.

2016 

In 2016, Schatz ran for and easily won his first full six-year Senate term against only nominal opposition.

According to New York magazine, Schatz had a low-profile but highly influential effect on the Democratic primary for the 2020 presidential election by pushing fellow Democrats to commit to progressive positions on issues such as healthcare, climate, college affordability and Social Security.

2022 

Schatz announced he intended to run for reelection for a second full term. He was challenged by Republican state representative Bob McDermott. Schatz won overwhelmingly, earning 69.4% of the total vote.

Tenure
During his time in the Senate, Schatz has developed a reputation as a liberal Democrat. He tends to vote with his party on both policy and procedural issues most of the time. GovTrack ranks Schatz as a more moderate member of his caucus. Schatz has been a part of numerous pieces of bipartisan legislation. He has co-sponsored 48 bills that have become law, including the bipartisan Veterans' Compensation Cost-of-Living Adjustment Act of 2021 and the John D. Dingell, Jr. Conservation, Management, and Recreation Act. He has been the primary sponsor for seven bills, including the Native American Veterans' Memorial Amendments Act of 2013 and the NIST Small Business Cybersecurity Act. His primary areas of focus include healthcare, education, government operations, and national security. Schatz was instrumental in increasing the minimum smoking age to 21 and securing paid family leave for federal workers. He has also led efforts to expand telehealth services.

Schatz has also brought a large amount of federal funding to Hawaii. He secured reservation funding and transportation funding.

Schatz was participating in the certification of the 2021 United States Electoral College vote count when Trump supporters stormed the United States Capitol. He called the storming "despicable." Schatz called for Trump's removal from office through both the invocation of the Twenty-fifth Amendment to the U.S. Constitution and the impeachment process. He called Trump a "danger to democracy itself". Schatz twice voted to impeach Trump.

Leadership positions
 Chief Deputy Whip
 Co-chair, Senate Climate Change Task Force
 Chair, Senate Democratic Special Committee on the Climate Crisis
 Member, Board of Trustees for the Harry S. Truman Scholarship foundation

Committee assignments
Committee on Appropriations
Subcommittee on Agriculture, Rural Development, Food and Drug Administration, and Related Agencies
Subcommittee on Commerce, Justice, Science, and Related Agencies
Subcommittee on Defense
Subcommittee on Labor, Health and Human Services, and Education, and Related Agencies
Subcommittee on Military Construction and Veterans Affairs, and Related Agencies
Subcommittee on Transportation, Housing and Urban Development, and Related Agencies (Chair)
Committee on Commerce, Science and Transportation
Committee on Foreign Relations
Committee on Indian Affairs (Chair)
Select Committee on Ethics

Caucus memberships
 Congressional Asian Pacific American Caucus
 Congressional NextGen 9-1-1 Caucus
Expand Social Security Caucus

Political positions
According to New York magazine, Schatz is a progressive but not a "Sanders-style bomb-thrower." He was characterized as a low-profile yet highly influential senator in pushing fellow Democrats to adopt progressive policy positions. The American Conservative Union gave him a 3% lifetime conservative rating in 2013.

Abortion 
Schatz is pro-choice. He supports access to legal abortion without restrictions. NARAL Pro-Choice America gave him a 100% rating.

Budget and economy 
Schatz supports income tax increases to balance the budget and federal spending to support economic growth.

LGBTQIA+ rights
Schatz supports same-sex marriage. He sponsored legislation in 2015 to allow married gay couples to have equal access to the veterans benefits and Social Security they have earned. Schatz supports LGBTQIA+ rights and same-sex marriage. He received a 100% rating from the Human Rights Campaign. Schatz supports transgender rights.

Drugs 
Schatz stopped short of calling for the legalization of marijuana in Hawaii in 2014, and has called for the criminalization of date-rape drugs. In 2016, he advocated for immunity for banks offering services to marijuana businesses.

Economy
To encourage tourism in West Hawaii, Schatz proposed that customs begin in Japan so that planes can arrive in West Hawaii as domestic flights.

Environment
In March 2014, Schatz was a lead organizer of an overnight talkathon devoted to discussing climate change. The gathering of over two dozen Senate Democrats took place on the Senate floor. The League of Conservation Voters supported the talkathon and ran campaign ads on Schatz's behalf. He has received a perfect score from the League of Conservation Voters.

In 2019, Schatz voiced his support for both a Green New Deal and a carbon tax as means to reduce emissions, saying that the two proposals are "perfectly compatible" with each other.

Schatz believes that climate change is a threat and has supported clean energy initiatives. In 2013, he wrote an op-ed promoting subsidies for wind turbines. He has advocated for 50% clean and carbon-free electricity by 2030. He opposed the Keystone Pipeline.

Along with Martin Heinrich and Sheldon Whitehouse, Schatz is one of the "Three Climateers" of the Senate, driving and negotiating legislation to address climate change, culminating in the Inflation Reduction Act of 2022.

Foreign policy
Schatz criticized China's island-building activities, saying that "China's outsized claim to the entire South China Sea has no basis in international law."

In October 2017, Schatz condemned the genocide of the Rohingya Muslim minority in Myanmar and called for a stronger response to the crisis.

Schatz spearheaded a nonbinding resolution in July 2018 "warning President Trump not to let the Russian government question diplomats and other officials". The resolution states the United States "should refuse to make available any current or former diplomat, civil servant, political appointee, law enforcement official or member of the Armed Forces of the United States for questioning by the government of Vladimir Putin". It passed 98-0.

Gun law 
Schatz supports gun control legislation. He voted for a 2013 bill banning high-capacity magazines of over 10 bullets, and co-sponsored legislation requiring background checks for every firearm sale in 2019. As of 2010, the National Rifle Association had given Schatz a "C" rating for his mixed voting record regarding gun law.

Schatz participated in the Chris Murphy gun control filibuster in 2016. He expressed disappointment when both the Democrat-proposed Feinstein Amendment (making the sale of firearms to individuals on the terrorist watchlist illegal) and the Republican-supported background check changes and gun sale alert system did not pass the Senate. He said: 
More than 90% of Americans demand we take action on gun violence, but again Senate Republicans refuse to act. It's unacceptable. Right now, known terrorists are banned from getting on an airplane, but they are still allowed to buy military-style weapons. It is absolutely insane. After one of the most horrific mass shootings in our history, we saw people across the country courageously stand up against gun violence and hatred. When will Republicans in Congress finally do the same?

In response to the 2017 Las Vegas shooting, Schatz said, "We can do more than lower the flag to half-mast. We can take a stand against gun violence by passing common-sense gun safety laws."

Health care
Schatz supports Sen. Bernie Sanders' single-payer proposal, but also introduced his own proposal which would allow states to expand Medicaid into a universal system. Schatz supports the Affordable Care Act but supported a religious exemption from its individual mandate.

Housing 
In April 2019, Schatz was one of forty-one senators to sign a bipartisan letter to the housing subcommittee praising the United States Department of Housing and Urban Development's Section 4 Capacity Building program as authorizing "HUD to partner with national nonprofit community development organizations to provide education, training, and financial support to local community development corporations (CDCs) across the country" and expressing disappointment that President Trump's budget "has slated this program for elimination after decades of successful economic and community development." The senators wrote of their hope that the subcommittee would support continued funding for Section 4 in Fiscal Year 2020.

Privacy rights
In one of his first Senate votes, Schatz voted against the FISA Amendments Act Reauthorization Act of 2012. On April 17, 2013, he voted to expand background checks for gun purchases.

Schatz voted for the Cybersecurity Information Sharing Act, a bill many civil liberties groups opposed.

Personal life
Schatz is married to Linda Kwok Kai Yun. They have two children.

Schatz has three brothers, including an identical twin brother, Steve. Steve is executive director of Hawaii P-20 Partnerships for Education, an interagency educational partnership at the University of Hawaii at Manoa. He formerly ran the Hawaii Department of Education's Office of Strategic Reform.

Electoral history

References

External links 

Senator Brian Schatz official U.S. Senate website
Brian Schatz for Senate campaign website

|-

|-

|-

|-

|-

|-

|-

|-

|-

|-

|-

|-

1972 births
20th-century American politicians
21st-century American politicians
Democratic Party United States senators from Hawaii
Identical twins
Jewish United States senators
Lieutenant Governors of Hawaii
Living people
Democratic Party members of the Hawaii House of Representatives
Politicians from Ann Arbor, Michigan
Pomona College alumni
Punahou School alumni
State political party chairs of Hawaii
American twins
21st-century American Jews